is a passenger railway station in the city of Kimitsu, Chiba Prefecture, Japan, operated by the East Japan Railway Company (JR East).

Lines
Shimogōri Station is a station on the Kururi Line, and is located 15.2 km from the terminus of the line at Kisarazu Station.

Station layout
The station consists of a single side platform serving bidirectional traffic. The platform is short, and can only handle trains with a length of three carriages or less. The station is unattended.

Platform

History
Shimogōri Station was opened on April 20, 1937. It was closed in 1944 due to World War II, but reopened in January 1947, but as utilization was very low, it closed again until April 1, 1956. The station was absorbed into the JR East network upon the privatization of the JNR on April 1, 1987.

Passenger statistics
In fiscal 2006, the station was used by an average of 78 passengers daily.

Surrounding area

See also
 List of railway stations in Japan

References

External links

  JR East Station information 

Kururi Line
Stations of East Japan Railway Company
Railway stations in Chiba Prefecture
Railway stations in Japan opened in 1937
Kimitsu